The International School of Macao (Chinese: 澳門國際學校), is an international school in Taipa, Macao next to the Macau International Airport. It occupies blocks K and Q of the Macau University of Science and Technology. It is accredited by Alberta, Canada.

History
TIS was established in 2002 to provide a Canadian curriculum and accreditation to local and expatriate students. English is the primary language of instruction. TIS opened with an initial total enrolment of 58 students on the campus of Macau University of Science and Technology. By 2006, the school had grown to over 500 students and moved into the first phase of its new, purpose-built facility on the MUST campus. It also became accredited with the Ministry of Education in Alberta, Canada. The Intentional School of Macao is also offers the International Baccalaureate Diploma Programme (IBDP) as an option to Grade 11 and 12 students. 

Initially the school was in Block E.

In 2008, TIS offered its first Grade 12 courses and by June 2009, 27 students had graduated, earning the Alberta High School Diploma. 99% of TIS graduates have received offers of admission from more than 250 universities around the world.

In 2016 the school announced it would spend 180 million Macau patacas ($22,400,000 U.S. dollars) to build the campus's second phase.

In 2017, the school started the IBDP alongside the existing Alberta curriculum. Students can choose to study the Alberta Diploma only with no IBDP, Alberta Diploma with selected IB courses or Alberta Diploma and the full IB Diploma in grade 11 (form 5).

Student body
 40% of the students are from Macau, 16% come from elsewhere in Asia (except Macau and Southeast Asia), 13% each from Europe and North America, 8% from Australia, 6% from Southeast Asia, .6% from South America, and 1.6% from elsewhere.

Technology
TIS is the leading school in Macau in innovation and technology, the school fully integrated into teaching and learning at TIS. In total TIS has 252 Laptops, 102 iPads, 4 Computer Labs and 72 interactive whiteboards.

Think Digital Programme
The “Think Digital” Laptop Programme started in September 2015 and requires each student in secondary school (Grade 7+) to bring a MacBook or Chromebook laptop to school each day. Students can use their laptops to access different sources and collaborate with others in a variety of ways.

References

External links
 International School of Macao

International schools in Macau
Educational institutions established in 2002
2002 establishments in Macau
Macao